Serine/arginine repetitive matrix protein 1 is a protein that in humans is encoded by the SRRM1 gene.

Interactions 

SRRM1 has been shown to interact with CDC5L.

References

Further reading

External links